Plagiostachys bracteolata is a monocotyledonous plant species described by Rosemary Margaret Smith. Plagiostachys bracteolata is part of the genus Plagiostachys and the family Zingiberaceae. No subspecies are listed in the Catalog of Life.

References 

bracteolata
Taxa named by Rosemary Margaret Smith